Chantal Bournissen (born 6 April 1967 in Arolla, Valais) is a Swiss former alpine skier. She won the 1991 World Championship in Alpine Combined.

References 

1967 births
Living people
People from Hérens District
Swiss female alpine skiers
FIS Alpine Ski World Cup champions
Olympic alpine skiers of Switzerland
Alpine skiers at the 1988 Winter Olympics
Alpine skiers at the 1992 Winter Olympics
Alpine skiers at the 1994 Winter Olympics
Sportspeople from Valais
20th-century Swiss women